Francisco Silviano de Almeida Brandão (8 September 1848 – 25 September 1902) was a Brazilian politician who was elected Vice President of Brazil, but died before taking office.

In Belo Horizonte, the Silviano Brandão State Public School, founded on 5 January 1914, was named in his honour.

References

1848 births
1902 deaths
19th-century Brazilian people
20th-century Brazilian people
Vice presidents of Brazil
People from Minas Gerais
Coffee with milk politics politicians
Elected officials who died without taking their seats

Candidates for Vice President of Brazil